Botnar is a surname. Notable people with the surname include:

 Octav Botnar (1913–1998), British businessman
 Vitali Botnar (born 2001), Russian footballer

See also
 Fondation Botnar, philanthropic foundation